Hugo Andrés Díaz Fernández (born 23 February 1987) is a Chilean footballer, who currently plays as a midfielder for Fernández Vial.

External links
 BDFA profile

1987 births
Living people
Chilean footballers
Cobreloa footballers
Cobresal footballers
Rangers de Talca footballers
San Antonio Unido footballers
Everton de Viña del Mar footballers
Association football midfielders